List of Scream Queens episodes may refer to:

 List of Scream Queens (2008 TV series) episodes, episode list for the 2008 VH1 reality TV series
 List of Scream Queens (2015 TV series) episodes, episode list for the 2015 Fox horror/black comedy series